Somewhere in Dreamland is a 1936 animated short in Max Fleischer's Color Classics series. The film was produced by Max Fleischer, directed by Dave Fleischer, co-directed by Dawn Fleischer, and was animated by Fleischer veterans Seymour Kneitel and Roland Crandall. The cartoon, set during the contemporary Great Depression, follows two impoverished children who dream that they are in Dreamland where there is an area full of candy and ice cream. The cartoon is Fleischer's first in three-strip Technicolor.

Plot
On a winter evening, a young brother and sister in ragged clothes pull a wagon through town, gathering firewood. They pass by several merchants' shops and stop for a moment to admire the confectioneries in the bakery. As a friendly baker sees the children, he goes inside and comes back with cupcakes for them, but they have already left. The baker, the tailor, and the market owner gather to make a plan to help the poor children.

The children reach their rundown home and sit down to supper consisting of hard bread and flat water. The children eat quickly, with the boy saying that he is still hungry. Their mother, unable to provide more food, begins to cry, at which the boy takes back what he said to comfort her, and she then kisses them goodnight. They change into their nighties, and they each sing a part of a song as they fall asleep beneath their tattered sheets.

In their sleep, they enter Dreamland. They happily frolic through the wondrous land, which includes a merry-go-round cake, fields that grow ice cream cones and popcorn, toys, nice clothes, and two luxurious beds. They skip and laugh happily and then lie down on the soft beds, only to awaken back in their own shabby bedroom.

To their surprise, a large feast is on the kitchen table, as well as toys and clothing surrounding the room, all of which is provided by the merchants. The children look up to the baker, the tailor, and the market owner, asking twice if all these things are for them. The merchants nod in affirmation. The children shout in joy and begin to eat. However, the boy, suspicious of his good fortune, sticks a fork in his bottom to ensure that he is not still dreaming. The children laugh and continue to eat as the cartoon closes.

Trivia
 This was Fleischer Studios' first film in three-strip Technicolor.
 This cartoon is available on numerous public domain cartoon compilation DVDs and VHS tapes, but some of the included prints omit the first three minutes of the cartoon, instead starting with the children singing "Somewhere in Dreamland" in their beds before going to sleep.
 Some copies of Somewhere in Dreamland circulate with NTA openings and closings, with the "in TECHNICOLOR" and "COPYRIGHT 1936 PARAMOUNT PRODUCTIONS. ALL RIGHTS RESERVED." bylines censored with a black bar on the main title card, while others circulate with original Paramount openings and closings. This is one of very few Color Classics to widely circulate with original Paramount title cards, whereas (in most current media) the rest have their openings digitally recreated.
 In 2021, as part of a new initiative by the Fleischer estate (in co-operation with Paramount Pictures) to formally restore the Fleischers’ entire filmography, a remastered print of Somewhere in Dreamland (sourced from the original negatives) premiered on the MeTV network on December 13 during MeTV's Super Colossal Cartoon Christmas, later re-airing on their weekday morning cartoon series Toon In with Me.
 This show was included in an episode of Donald's Quack Attack.
 A clip of the cartoon was shown in the opening for Wonder Showzen.
 Tom Petty’s band Mudcrutch used the sound bite “But, I’m still hungry mom... ahh, I’m just foolin’." from this cartoon in the music video for their song "I Forgive It All".

References

External links
 

1930s American animated films
1930s animated short films
1930s color films
1936 animated films
1936 short films
American animated short films
Color Classics cartoons
Films about dreams
Films about poverty
Fleischer Studios short films
Great Depression films
Paramount Pictures short films
Short films directed by Dave Fleischer
1930s English-language films
Animated films about children
Films about single parent families
Animated films about siblings